The Chinese Embassy in Berlin, officially the Embassy of the People's Republic of China in the Federal Republic of Germany is the head of the diplomatic mission of the People's Republic of China in Germany. There has been diplomatic mission of China in Berlin since 1877. The current embassy is located at Märkisches Ufer 54 near the Jannowitz Bridge in Luisenstadt in Berlin-Mitte. The seven-storey building, built in 1988 as the FDGB headquarter, was rebuilt from 1999 to 2001 to the present-day embassy.

Embassy of the PRC in the united Germany 
The building complex near the Jannowitz Bridge, in use since 1999, was built in 1988 after the plans of Jens Ebert for 182 million marks and was the new seat of the Federal Board of FDGB ("House of Unions"). After Die Wende, it was rebuilt to a convention center ("Berliner Congress Center - BCC"), but soon went out of service. As a result of the Capital Decision in 1991, the Chinese Embassy (in the former West Germany) moved in 1999 from Bonn to Berlin. Both Chinese embassies merged and acquired the convention center. The conversion was carried out according to plans of Novotny Mähner Associated. The building has a silver exterior, decorated with mirrored windows. There is a sculpture of a Chinese guardian lion on the portal.

The Chinese Embassy consists of the following areas:
 Consular department
 Political department 
 Department of Press and Public Relations 
 Military department 
 Culture department 
 Department of Science and Technology 
 Department of Economic and Commercial
 Education Department.
Since March 2019 the ambassador is Wu Ken; his predecessor was Shi Mingde. There are Consulates General in Frankfurt am Main, Hamburg, Munich and Düsseldorf.

See also 
 List of ambassadors of China to Germany
 China-Germany relations

References

External links 
  Official Website of the Embassy of the People's Republic of China
 Chinese Embassy on BauNetz

Diplomatic missions in Berlin
China–Germany relations
Diplomatic missions of China
1980s architecture